Vidya Mandir Senior Secondary School is a school in India, in the southern city of Chennai. Founded in 1956 by M. Subbaraya Aiyar, R. S. Subbalakshmi and Padmini Chari, the school recently celebrated its 60th anniversary in 2016. It follows the Central Board of Secondary Education (CBSE) pattern of education with the medium of instruction being English. With just a handful of boys in 1956, studying at the Mylapore Ladies' Club premises, the school now has about 2200 students, 119 teachers, three school buildings in the same location and a branch called VidyaMandir located inside the Estancia Township on GST Road, Vallancheri.

History 
The MLC School Society (Mylapore Ladies’ Club) established a Kindergarten Section on 3 February 1956 to accommodate the boys in Mylapore and its environs. The first president of the society was R. S. Subbalakshmi, supported by M. Subbaraya Aiyar, a leading lawyer, and Mrs. Padmini Chari who was an educationist. Thus the school was born through the efforts of these three, and Vidya Mandir Matriculation School was formally opened in 1960. R. S. Subbalakshmi and Mrs V.K.T Chari served as the Founder President and School Correspondent respectively. M. Subbaraya Aiyar became the Secretary of the school.

In 1960, once the school was formally opened as a boys school, the first batch of students took the exam. In 1963 a small building was constructed and the matriculation section was opened. The school followed the matriculation system until 1975 when it became affiliated with the Central Board of Secondary Education (CBSE). 1978 was a significant year as the first batch of students took the 10th Standard examination and the school became a co-educational school.

In 1981, to commemorate the 25th year, a Silver Jubilee Kindergarten Block was constructed. In 1989, the school established a branch school located in Gandhi Nagar, Chennai which later became an independent school called Bala Vidya Mandir.

In 1993, a new primary block was constructed and in 1997 a new administrative block was constructed. In 2001, a new open air theatre was built to host the school cultural activities and other school events and a library was built in the same year.

In 2010 the school introduced a filing system and shifted to a two term year from a three term year as prescribed by the CBSE.

School Activities

Events 
The school hosts a variety of cultural and educational events annually. Some of the events are

 Entre-Nous (Inter-Class cultural event)
 Reflections (Inter-School cultural event)
 Inter-House Dramatics (House-wise dramatic presentations)
 School Day
 Sports Day
 Fun-Fest
 Project Day

Clubs 
The school has a number of clubs that the students can participate in such as Martial Arts, Mathematics Music, Environment, Commerce, Reading, Trekking, Study Circles.

Notable alumni

Sports 

Krishnamachari Srikkanth
Laxman Sivaramakrishnan
Sadagopan Ramesh 
Ramesh Krishnan
Abhinav Mukund 
Bhargav Sri Prakash

Arts 

Mani Ratnam
G. Venkateswaran
P C Sreeram
Mohan Raman
Shashank
Sanjay Subrahmanyan
Rithvik Raja
Sikkil Gurucharan
Anil Srinivasan
Karthik Kumar
Venkat Prabhu
Vikram Prabhu
Mathivanan Rajendran
 Aravind Subramanian
   Ambashish Pandey
   Vidyullekha Raman

Business

Motto
The motto of Vidya Mandir is "Saha Veeryam Karavavahai" which means "Let the student and teacher perform great acts of strength together".

References

 Timeline
 https://www.vidyamandirestancia.com

High schools and secondary schools in Chennai
Educational institutions established in 1956
1956 establishments in Madras State